Jeff Coetzee and Chris Haggard were the defending champions but only Haggard competed that year with André Sá.

Haggard and Sá lost in the final 6–0, 6–4 against Devin Bowen and Ashley Fisher.

Seeds

  Lucas Arnold /  Mariano Hood (first round)
  Chris Haggard /  André Sá (final)
  Simon Aspelin /  Massimo Bertolini (quarterfinals)
  Devin Bowen /  Ashley Fisher (champions)

Draw

External links
 2003 Priority Telecom Open Doubles Draw

Dutch Open (tennis)
2003 ATP Tour
2003 Dutch Open (tennis)